Tudor Giurgiu (born 1972 in Cluj-Napoca, Romania) is a Romanian film director. He was President of Romanian National Television, TVR between 2005 and 2007. Tudor Giurgiu is also a director of music videos and has made documentaries. Giurgiu owns Librafilm, an independent production company and is the founder and president of Romanian Film Promotion, which puts on the Transilvania International Film Festival.

Love Sick, his first full-length film, was released in Romania 2006.

Filmography
 Vecini, 1993
 Popcorn Story, 2001
 Love Sick, 2006
 Ashes and Blood, 2009 (producer)
 Of Snails and Men (2012)
 Why Me? (2015)
 Parking (2019)

Notes

External links
 
 An interview with Tudor Giurgiu

1972 births
Living people
Film people from Cluj-Napoca
Romanian film directors